Slovenia competed at the 2011 World Aquatics Championships in Shanghai, China, between 16 and 31 July 2011.

Open water swimming

Men

Women

Swimming

Slovenia qualified 11 swimmers.

Men

Women

References

Nations at the 2011 World Aquatics Championships
2011 in Slovenian sport
Slovenia at the World Aquatics Championships